Jilan may refer to:
Cilən, Azerbaijan 
Jilan, Iran, a village in Semnan Province, Iran
Gilan Province, Iran
 吉兰 (吉蘭), a geographic name in the medieval Chinese literature

See also
 Jiran, India